Thunder Over Jotunheim is a role-playing game adventure published by TSR in 1985 for the Marvel Super Heroes role-playing game.

Plot summary
Thunder Over Jotunheim is a solo scenario featuring the "Magic Viewer" system whereby secret information is revealed to the player who reads it through tinted lenses. Thor goes on a quest to the land of the giants, where he must foil a plot by Loki to conquer Asgard.

In Thunder Over Jotunheim, the player is the Mighty Thor, whose evil half-brother Loki plots with the storm giants to bring about Asgard's downfall. Loki has stolen the sword of Frey, a weapon of mighty power. Armed with his hammer Mjolnir and a gift from the sorceress Karnilla, Queen of the Norns, Thor wanders the landscape from the Domain of the Rock Trolls to the Flaming Chasm to the Forest of Nightmare Plants, searching for the sword and Loki.

Thunder Over Jotunheim is a solo module starring Thor and villains such as Loki, Geirrodur, Ulik, and the Executioner. It includes a large fold-out map of the Asgardian wilderness with area encounters, depicted as hammers, and linked by lines along with Thor can travel. As Thor lands on an encounter space, the player turns to the descriptive booklet to see what happens. The module features a system involving obscuring the secret paragraphs with red dots; a tinted piece of plastic is enclosed which when placed over the dots makes them vanish, allowing the player to read whatever is underneath. In the plot, Odin has vanished, leaving Thor to handle the crisis in Asgard. Loki has taken a magical sword that belonged to Frey. Thor is told that without the sword, Asgard is extremely vulnerable to sudden attack by hordes of Giants, Trolls and others. Thor is given a gift by Karnilla before setting out to retrieve the sword, and there are six gifts to choose from.

Publication history
MH6 Thunder Over Jotunheim was written by Bruce Nesmith, with a cover by Jeff Butler, and was published by TSR, Inc., in 1985 as a 16-page book, a large map, a viewer film, and an outer folder.

Reception
Steve Crow reviewed Thunder Over Jotunheim in The Space Gamer No. 76. Crow comments that, "Thunder Over Jotunheim, the first solo module for Marvel Super Heroes, provides a convenient way for a player to use some of the non-group heroes such as Thor [...] heroes that are popular at Marvel but otherwise wouldn't get much module coverage. The module uses the various 'gifts of Karnilla' to generate a different location and differing clues for the sword of Frey each time. With the relatively simple combat rules of Marvel Super Heroes, the simple guidelines for combat with no supervising gamemaster works quite well. The random chart for different magical spells used by spellcasters could be used in other MSH modules to a similar purpose". He continues: "On the other hand, most of the encounters seem a little powerful for Thor to handle, due to his relatively low body armor. Upon leaving Asgard from one of two paths, Thor ends up in a battle where he is either almost certainly defeated, or leaves and forfeits all of his Karma. Several other battles are in a similar vein: no rules for fleeing a combat are provided, so the assumption is that once Thor is in a fight, he's in it to the finish. And finally, the map, which has paths going from one locale to the next, the distance between locales taking exactly one day to traverse, is really useless as an actual map. So if you intend to use this module as the beginning of the further adventures of Thor, the map is practically useless for that purpose." Crow concluded the review by saying, "Overall, Thunder Over Jotunheim is an adequate one-shot solitaire adventure, but its usefulness for a continuing campaign is almost nil. An interesting tidbit for avid Marvel Super Heroes players, of little or no use to players of other superhero RPGs."

Rob Nott reviewed Thunder Over Jotunheim for Imagine magazine. He describes the module as "a cross between an RPG and a board game, similar in style to the old SPI game John Carter of Mars". He calls the magic viewer system an improvement over TSR's prior "system of Magic Marker pens which entailed long periods of whacking away at obscured text to render it readable", making it "Quick, simple, and it allows others to use the module when you've finished." He noted that Karnilla providing Thor with six possible gifts "provides a variable element to the adventure" as "each of which can create a different story, so in theory one player can use the module six times before exhausting the possibilities". He continued: "There are lots of encounters, albeit rather simple ones, and plenty of opportunities for accumulating KARMA. I managed to get quite a nice stack of it before having to hit anything." Nott concluded by saying: "Overall, I found the module an interesting experiment with solo game design, though not really very challenging in a role-playing sense. If you enjoy solo games, though, I think you'll find this one of the better ones around."

References

Marvel Comics role-playing game adventures
Role-playing game supplements introduced in 1985